Arroz chaufa, also known as arroz de chaufa (Chinese rice), is a fried rice dish from Peru. It is part of the Chinese Peruvian cuisine, which is called chifa.  

Arroz chaufa consists of a mix of fried rice with vegetables, usually including scallions, eggs, and chicken, quickly cooked at high heat, often in a wok with soy sauce and oil. It comes from the Chinese cuisine due to the influx of Chinese immigrants to Peru at the end of the 19th century.  

The meats typically used are usually pork, beef, chicken, and shrimp. Dark soy sauce is preferred for use with Peruvian fried rice. A person specialized in the art of making arroz chaufa is known as a chaufero.

Etymology
The word "chaufa" comes from the Chinese word "chaofan" (Simplified Chinese: 炒饭, Traditional Chinese: 炒飯, Pinyin: chǎofàn, Cantonese: Cháau Faahn), literally “(stir) fried rice".

Variations
It typically includes cecina (a salted dried meat) and maduros (sweet plantains).

It is also possible to adapt the recipe with other grains, like quinoa and wheat. In some regions the rice is replaced with quinoa or pearled wheat while in others, rice is mixed with noodles.

The dish is accompanied by soy sauce and/or an ají-based cream.

Besides this, many other ingredients may be found in the dish:

 Arroz chaufa with chicken
 Arroz chaufa with beef
 Arroz chaufa with pork
 Aeropuerto (airport): when the dish includes tallarín saltado, another chifa dish, on the same plate.
 Arroz chaufa "wild"
 Arroz chaufa with duck
 Arroz chaufa with jerky
 Arroz chaufa with seafood
 Arroz chaufa with fish
 Arroz chaufa with alligator or lizard
 Arroz chaufa "special"
 Arroz chaufa "Taypa"

See also
 List of fried rice dishes

References

Further reading

Fried rice
Peruvian cuisine
Chinese fusion cuisine